Laura Tarantola (born 8 June 1994) is a French rower. At the 2018 European Rowing Championships in Glasgow, Scotland, she won the silver medal in light weight skiffs. In the 2018 World Rowing Championships in Plovdiv, Bulgaria, she won a gold medal in the women's lightweight single sculls event.

References

External links

French female rowers
World Rowing Championships medalists for France
Living people
1994 births
Rowers at the 2020 Summer Olympics
Medalists at the 2020 Summer Olympics
Olympic medalists in rowing
Olympic silver medalists for France
20th-century French women
21st-century French women